, formerly known as Callme, is a Japanese idol girl group consisting of former Dorothy Little Happy members. They released their debut single, "To shine", on March 4, 2015.

Members
Ruuna Akimoto (秋元瑠海)
Mimori Tominaga (富永美杜)
Koumi Hayasaka (早坂香美)

Discography

Studio albums

Singles

References

External links
Official website

Japanese girl groups
Japanese idol groups
Japanese pop music groups
Musical groups from Tokyo
Musical groups established in 2015
2015 establishments in Japan